This is a list of major awards won by Johnny Cash.

Wins

Academy of Country Music
1969 Television Personality of the Year
1970 Television Personality of the Year
1985 Single of the Year as part of The Highwaymen – "Highwayman"
1990 Pioneer Award

American Music Awards
1986 Favorite Country Video "Highwayman" with Willie Nelson, Waylon Jennings and Kris Kristofferson

Americana Music Association
2002 "Spirit of Americana" Free Speech Award
2003 Album of the Year – American IV: The Man Comes Around
2003 Artist of the Year
 2003 Song of the Year - "Hurt"

Country Music Association
1968 Album of the Year – "At Folsom Prison"
1969 Album of the Year – "At San Quentin"
1969 Entertainer of the Year
1969 Male Vocalist of the Year
1969 Single of the Year – "A Boy Named Sue"
1969 Vocal Group of the Year with June Carter Cash
2003 Album of the Year – "American IV: The Man Comes Around"
2003 Single of the Year – "Hurt"
2003 Music Video of the Year – "Hurt"

Grammy Awards
1968 Best Country & Western Performance, Duet, Trio Or Group with June Carter Cash – "Jackson"
1969 Best Album Notes – "At Folsom Prison"
1969 Best Country Vocal Performance, Male – "Folsom Prison Blues"
1970 Best Album Notes – "Nashville Skyline"
1970 Best Country Vocal Performance, Male – "A Boy Named Sue"
1971 Best Country Performance by a Duo or Group with Vocal with June Carter Cash – "If I Were A Carpenter"
1987 Best Spoken Word or Non-musical Album with Carl Perkins, Chips Moman. Jerry Lee Lewis, Ricky Nelson, Roy Orbison and Sam Philips – "Interviews from the Class of '55 Recording Sessions"
1995 Best Contemporary Folk Album – "American Recordings"
1998 Best Country Album – "Unchained"
1998 Grammy Hall of Fame Award – "I Walk The Line"
1998 Grammy Hall of Fame Award – "Ring of Fire"
1999 Grammy Lifetime Achievement Award
2001 Best Male Country Vocal Performance – "Solitary Man"
2002 Best Country Album – Awarded to various artists for contributions to Timeless, a Hank Williams Tribute album.
2003 Best Male Country Vocal Performance – "Give My Love To Rose"
2004 Best Country Album – Awarded to various artists for contributions to Livin', Lovin', Losin': Songs of the Louvin Brothers.
2004 Best Short Form Video – "Hurt"
2008 Best Short Form Video – "God's Gonna Cut You Down"

Hall of fame inductions

Country Music Hall of Fame and Museum
Inducted in 1980

Cheyenne Frontier Days Old West Museum
Cheyenne Frontier Days Hall of Fame Inducted in 2003

Gospel Music Hall of Fame
Inducted in 2011

Memphis Music Hall of Fame
 Inducted in 2013

Nashville Songwriters Hall of Fame
Inducted in 1977

Rockabilly Hall of Fame
115th Inductee

Rock and Roll Hall of Fame
Inducted in 1992

Other awards

Hollywood Walk of Fame
on February 8, 1960

Horatio Alger Award
 Awarded in 1977

Golden Plate Award of the American Academy of Achievement
Awarded in 1988

Kennedy Center Honors
Awarded in 1996

MTV Video Music Awards
2003 Best Cinematography – "Hurt"

National Medal of Arts
Awarded in 2001

NME
Greatest music video of all time – "Hurt"

Nominations

Academy of Country Music
1965 Top Male Vocalist
1969 Album of the Year At Folsom Prison
1969 Single Record of the Year A Boy Named Sue
1969 Song of the Year A Boy Named Sue
1969 Specialty Instrument of the Year - Harmonica 
1969 Television Personality of the Year
1969 Top Male Vocalist
1970 Entertainer of the Year
1970 Song of the Year Sunday Mornin' Comin' Down
1970 Television Personality of the Year
1971 Television Personality of the Year
1985 Album of the Year as part of The Highwaymen for the album Highwayman
1985 Video of the Year for the video for the single "Highwayman"
2000 Album of the Year American III: Solitary Man

Country Music Association Awards
1967 Vocal Group of the Year with June Carter Cash
1968 Entertainer of the Year
1968 Male Vocalist of the Year
1968 Single of the Year Folsom Prison Blues
1968 Vocal Group of the Year  with June Carter Cash
1969 Single of the Year Daddy Sang Bass
1970 Album of the Year Hello, I'm Johnny Cash
1970 Entertainer of the Year
1970 Male Vocalist of the Year
1970 Vocal Duo of the Year with June Carter Cash
1971 Vocal Duo of the Year with June Carter Cash
1985 Music Video of the Year "Highwayman"
1985 Single of the Year "Highwayman"
1989 Vocal Event of the Year "That Old Wheel" with Hank Williams, Jr. 
1989 Vocal Event of the Year "Ballad of a Teenage Queen with Rosanne Cash and The Everly Brothers
1990 Vocal Event of the Year "Highwayman 2 with Willie Nelson, Waylon Jennings and Kris Kristofferson
1991 Vocal Event of the Year "Highwayman 2 with Willie Nelson, Waylon Jennings and Kris Kristofferson
1994 Vocal Event of the Year "The Devil Comes Back To Georgia" with Mark O'Connor, Marty Stuart, Charlie Daniels and Travis Tritt
2003 Vocal Event of the Year "Tears in the Holston River" with The Nitty Gritty Dirt Band

Grammy Awards 
1969 Album of the Year - At San Quentin
1969 Record of the Year - A Boy Named Sue
1970 Best Country Vocal Performance, Male - Sunday Mornin' Comin' Down
1972 Best Country Vocal Performance by a Duo or Group with June Carter Cash - "If I Had a Hammer"
1986 Best Country Performance by a Duo or Group with Vocal as part of The Highwaymen for the song Highwayman
1987 Best Country Performance by a Duo or Group with Vocal with Carl Perkins, Chips Moman. Jerry Lee Lewis, Ricky Nelson, Roy Orbison and Sam Philips – "Interviews from the Class of '55 Recording Sessions"
1990 Best Country Vocal Collaboration with Roy Acuff, Emmylou Harris, Levon Helm, The Nitty Gritty Dirt Band and Ricky Skaggs - "Will The Circle Be Unbroken"
1991 Best Country Vocal Collaboration with Willie Nelson, Waylon Jennings and Kris Kristofferson - "Highwayman 2"
1995 Best Country Vocal Collaboration with Mark O'Connor, Marty Stuart, Charlie Daniels and Travis Tritt - "The Devil Comes Back To Georgia"
1998 Best Male Country Vocal Performance - "Rusty Cage"
2001 Best Male Country Vocal Performance - "I Dreamed About Mama Last Night"
2002 Best Country Collaboration with Vocals with Fiona Apple - "Bridge Over Troubled Water"
2003 Best Country Collaboration with Vocals with June Carter Cash - "Temptation"
2004 Best Pop Collaboration with Vocals with Joe Strummer  - "Redemption Song"
2005 Best Male Country Vocal Performance - "Engine One-Forty-Three"

MTV Video Music Awards
2003 MTV Video Music Award for Best Art Direction
2003 MTV Video Music Award for Best Direction
2003 MTV Video Music Award for Best Editing
2003 MTV Video Music Award for Best Male Video
2003 MTV Video Music Award for Video of the Year

References

 

Cash, Johnny
Awards